Fösse is a small river of Lower Saxony, Germany. It flows into the Leine west of Hanover.

Environment
Much of the stream is channeled in the city of Hanover, where the water flows deeper in places and is piped and hidden in the green. A small water treading area has been integrated into the stream here since May 2014.

See also
List of rivers of Lower Saxony

References

Rivers of Lower Saxony
Rivers of Germany